Nintendo Video was a video on demand service for the Nintendo 3DS which streams hand-picked 3D and 2D video content from CollegeHumor, Aardman Animations, Blue Man Group, Channel Frederator Network and other studios. Previously, the service was available as a separate app that utilized SpotPass, downloading videos to the console's SD card via Wi-Fi Internet access for offline viewing. The Nintendo Video app launched in Australia, Europe, and Japan on the July 13, 2011, with initial videos including Oscar's Oasis and Magic Tricks for the Nintendo 3DS. New content could be automatically downloaded via SpotPass, replacing the old content. The app became available in North America on July 21, 2011. Since June 29, 2015, the app is no longer functional and videos can no longer be downloaded. In the following month, the Nintendo eShop offered most of the videos for streaming on demand, with a total of 164 videos available.

History 
In 2012, Nintendo created a joint venture for Nintendo Video Original Series and distributed their first Original Series for Nintendo Video, Threediots.

On February 27, 2014, Nintendo Australia announced they are terminating the service in the Oceanian region (Australia and New Zealand) as of March 31, 2014. Nintendo of Europe also announced on the same day that they would be terminating the Nintendo Video service on the same date. Nintendo also announced the end of the service on that date, ending it on March 31, 2014 as well.

On June 5, 2015, Nintendo of America sent out a SpotPass notification to all of the app's active users informing them that the app was being phased out in favor of an eponymous category on the Nintendo eShop's main page (already available at the time) where users can watch most past videos as well as future ones. To replace the Nintendo Video feature, a few months after the My Nintendo service released, videos for permanent download became a common reward that could be bought with My Nintendo coins. Videos would commonly make returns due to popularity or stay longer due to positive fan reception.

Content

Since June 2015, many of the shows listed below can be viewed on-demand via the Nintendo eShop in North America, permanently categorized under Nintendo Video. As of August 2019, a total of 164 videos are available on the eShop. Users had to enter in their date of birth before watching content that was considered too mature.

Shows

Music videos

Movie trailers 

Due to the promotional nature of film trailers, it may not be possible for any to return in any form.

See also 
Game Boy Advance Video
Nintendo Channel
Wii no Ma

Notes

References

External links 
 

2011 video games
Nintendo 3DS eShop games
Nintendo 3DS-only games
Nintendo 3DS games
Nintendo games
Nintendo Network
Video games developed in Japan
Products and services discontinued in 2015